Lupus is a city in Moniteau County, Missouri, United States. The population was 33 at the 2010 census. It is part of the Jefferson City, Missouri Metropolitan Statistical Area.

History
A post office called Lupus was established in 1884, and remained in operation until 1955. Lupus is a name derived from Latin meaning "wolf".

Geography
Lupus is located at  (38.846609, -92.452641).

Demographics

2010 census
At the 2010 census, there were 33 people, 17 households and 7 families residing in the city. The racial makeup of the city was 97.0% White and 3.0% from two or more races.

There were 17 households, of which 11.8% had children under the age of 18 living with them, 29.4% were married couples living together, 5.9% had a female householder with no husband present, 5.9% had a male householder with no wife present, and 58.8% were non-families. 41.2% of all households were made up of individuals, and 17.6% had someone living alone who was 65 years of age or older. The average household size was 1.94 and the average family size was 2.71.

The median age in the city was 57.8 years. 12.1% of residents were under the age of 18; 6% were between the ages of 18 and 24; 9.1% were from 25 to 44; 57.7% were from 45 to 64; and 15.2% were 65 years of age or older. The gender makeup of the city was 51.5% male and 48.5% female.

2000 census
At the 2000 census of 2000, there were 29 people, 18 households and 5 families residing in the town. The population density was 150.8 per square mile (58.9/km). There were 24 housing units at an average density of 124.8 per square mile (48.8/km). The racial makeup of the town was 100.00% White.

There were 18 households, of which 16.7% had children under the age of 18 living with them, 16.7% were married couples living together, 16.7% had a female householder with no husband present, and 66.7% were non-families. 61.1% of all households were made up of individuals, and 22.2% had someone living alone who was 65 years of age or older. The average household size was 1.61 and the average family size was 2.50.

20.7% of the population were under the age of 18, 3.4% from 18 to 24, 10.3% from 25 to 44, 51.7% from 45 to 64, and 13.8% who were 65 years of age or older. The median age was 49 years. For every 100 females, there were 123.1 males. For every 100 females age 18 and over, there were 91.7 males.

The median household income was $18,750 and the median family income was $18,750. Males had a median income of $23,750 compared with $63,750 for females. The per capita income for the town was $19,341. None of the population and none of the families were below the poverty line.

Arts and culture
The city is most well known for its chili festival, held every autumn, which draws over a thousand people from the surrounding area. The musical films Tom Sawyer and Huckleberry Finn, both based on Mark Twain's novels, were shot partially on location here. In 1976, the school of journalism at the University of Missouri published a book of photo essays on the history and the diminishing population of the city titled Lupus: portrait of a Missouri river town.

References

Cities in Moniteau County, Missouri
Jefferson City metropolitan area
Missouri populated places on the Missouri River
Cities in Missouri